Geoffrey Thwaites (born 24 April 1947) is a British former swimmer. He competed in two events at the 1964 Summer Olympics.

References

1947 births
Living people
British male swimmers
Olympic swimmers of Great Britain
Swimmers at the 1964 Summer Olympics
Place of birth missing (living people)